Some fungi are considered invasive species in certain parts of the world:

Amanita muscaria
Amanita phalloides
Batrachochytrium dendrobatidis
Batrachochytrium salamandrivorans
Carpenterella
Cryphonectria parasitica – causes chestnut blight
Cucumispora dikerogammari
Geosmithia morbida which, in partnership with the walnut twig beetle Pityophthorus juglandis, causes thousand cankers disease
Heterobasidion irregulare
Hymenoscyphus fraxineus
Puccinia horiana – causes Chrysanthemum white rust
Puccinia psidii
Pucciniastrum americanum
Ophiognomonia clavigignenti-juglandacearum
certain Ophiostoma species which cause Dutch elm disease
Ophiostoma ulmi
Ophiostoma himal-ulmi
Ophiostoma novo-ulmi
Pseudogymnoascus destructans
Uredo rangelii

References

fungi
Invasive fungi